The 1965 Tennessee A&I Tigers football team represented Tennessee Agricultural & Industrial State College as a member of the Midwest Athletic Association (MAA) during the 1965 NCAA College Division football season. In their third season under head coach John Merritt, the Tigers compiled a 9–0–1 record, won the MAA championship, and outscored opponents by a total of 333 to 108. The team was also recognized as the 1965 black college national champion and was ranked No. 5 in the final 1965 NCAA College Division football rankings issued by the Associated Press and No. 12 in the final poll issued by the United Press International.

On December 11, Tennessee A&I played in the 1965 Grantland Rice Bowl against Ball State.  It the first college football game in Tennessee between an all-black team and a predominantly white team.

Key players included quarterback Eldridge Dickey, fullback Bill Tucker, halfback Noland Smith, wide receiver Willie Walker, split end Johnnie Robinson, middle guard/tackle James Carter, defensive lineman Franklin McRae, and defensive backs Alvin Coleman and Leon Moore. Coach Merritt described Carter as "the best lineman I've ever coached."

Schedule

References

Tennessee AandI
Tennessee State Tigers football seasons
Black college football national champions
College football undefeated seasons
Tennessee AandI Tigers